Harry Bennett Anderson (November 5, 1879 – April 9, 1935) was a United States district judge of the United States District Court for the Western District of Tennessee.

Education and career

Born in Van Buren County, Michigan, Anderson received a Bachelor of Philosophy degree from the University of Chicago, an Artium Magister degree from Christian Brothers College (now Christian Brothers University), followed by a Bachelor of Laws from Columbia Law School in 1904. He was in private practice in Memphis, Tennessee from 1904 to 1917, and was a member of the Republican state committee from 1904 to 1910. He was a lieutenant colonel in the United States Army during World War I from 1917 to 1918, thereafter returning to private practice in Memphis until 1925.

Federal judicial service

Anderson received a recess appointment from President Calvin Coolidge on September 12, 1925, to a seat on the United States District Court for the Western District of Tennessee vacated by Judge John William Ross. He was nominated to the same position by President Coolidge on December 8, 1925. He was confirmed by the United States Senate on January 29, 1926, and received his commission the same day. His service terminated on April 9, 1935, due to his death.

References

Sources
 

1879 births
1935 deaths
Christian Brothers University alumni
Columbia Law School alumni
Judges of the United States District Court for the Western District of Tennessee
United States district court judges appointed by Calvin Coolidge
20th-century American judges
United States Army officers